Daka Fifo is a village and seat of the commune of Haribomo in the Cercle of Gourma-Rharous in the Tombouctou Region of Mali.

References

Populated places in Tombouctou Region